Maricá Futebol Clube, better known as Maricá, is a sports association in the city of Maricá, in the state of Rio de Janeiro.
Founded on August 2, 2001 as a Rio de Janeiro Football Club, between 2017 and 2018 the club competed under the name of Rio de Janeiro/Maricá through a partnership between Rio de Janeiro and Maricá. On July 16, 2018, it was made official merger and the change in the name of the Rio de Janeiro Football Club to Maricá Futebol Clube. The headquarters was also changed, moving from Magé to Maricá.

History

Clube de Futebol Rio de Janeiro (2001-2017)
The Rio de Janeiro Football Club, initially conceived as the Grande Rio Sports Association, had been competing in the grassroots competitions for twelve years, but the name and registration were only formalized in 2002. 
The club is one of the greatest opportunities for young football talent in Piabetá. It has an eight-field training center in Piabetá, Magé. There are six official fields, one for games, two alternatives for training, plus two more projected. There is already a project for the construction of a future stadium on site itself. 
It was founded by professor Ênio Farias and has a vast number of players revealed for international football as midfielder Carlos Alberto, who played at club de Regatas Vasco da Gama.

In 2009, they won the State champion of the Third Division of Rio de Janeiro, junior category, by winning in the final the Leme Futebol Clube Zona Sul 4-3. The professional team competes in the same championship, failing to get past the first phase, when it is eliminated by Clube Atlético Castelo Branco, Heliópolis Atlético Clube and Rubro Social Esporte Clube.

Present (2017–2018)
Maricá's club emerged from a merger with Rio de Janeiro. Since 2005, the city had no professional staff. Founded in 2017, the club was conceived by Douglas Almeida, football manager with a stint in Araruama. The club came about with the aim of bringing back professional football to the city of Maricá, which since 2005, when Taquaral competed in the Rio Cup, did not have professional teams. 

The team partnered with the Rio de Janeiro Football Club to compete in the Campeonato Carioca Serie B2 already in its founding year.  The goal is to follow the path of other partnerships that worked in Rio football, such as the partnership between Campos Atlético Associação and Carapebus, a partnership between Arraial do Cabo and Araruama and the partnership between Santa Cruz and Belford Roxo. 

After announcing Polaco Valoura as coach for the State's B2 Series race, Maricá confirmed the name of 24 players who will be part of the squad this season. Among the pieces that will be available to Valoura are midfielder Lucas Candido and left back Maylson, who defended Araruama in the Third quarter last year.

The definition of the squad came shortly after the evaluations that the newly created club carried out in the city of Maricá. According to the football manager, Douglas Almeida, the athletes who had the names revealed will form the backbone of the team, which still seeks punctual signings to close the group. 

The team's first official game took place on May 28, 2017, against Angra dos Reis, a game that ended tied at 2-2.

Squad

See also 
 Brazilian football clubs

References

 Maricá